Roohi Bano, (August 10, 1951 – January 25, 2019) was a Pakistani actress who was known for her roles in Kiran Kahani, Zard Gulab, and Darwaza. She along with Uzma Gillani, Tahira Naqvi and Khalida Riyasat dominated Pakistan's television screens during the 1970s, 1980s and 1990s. She was known as The Queen of Melancholy because she portrayed roles of mournful, pessimistic and desolation in dramas and films.

Early life
Roohi Bano was born in Karachi on 10 August 1951. She was the daughter of Alla Rakha, a noted tabla player of India and half-sister of Indian music virtuoso Ustad Zakir Hussain.

Career
Roohi joined television when she was doing her Masters in Psychology from the Government College, Lahore.

According to news reports, "Roohi Bano witnessed the birth of the television industry in Pakistan..." Roohi acted memorably in Kiran Kahani (1972), Zard Gulab, Darwaza and many other famous TV dramas (nearly a total of 150 TV dramas ) in the decade of 1970s and 1980s. She was conferred the Pride of Performance award by the President of Pakistan in 1981. She also earned many PTV awards, notably Nigar Award, Graduate Award and Lux Lifetime Achievement Award.

Personal life
Roohi married twice but both of her marriages were unsuccessful and she had one son.

Later life and death
In 2005, her 20-year-old only son was killed by unidentified killers. He was murdered near his residence in Gulberg III, Lahore. His body was dumped alongside a fence where a passerby spotted it,  when he heard the ring tone of his cell phone. After this incident, Roohi Bano had abandoned her career and led a lonely life in Lahore and never fully recovered from this shocking and tragic event in her life. She had had schizophrenia for some years now due to her turbulent life and brutal murder of her only son. She also spent some years at the rehabilitation centre Fountain House in Lahore. Her own sister had her admitted to the rehabilitation centre in 2005.

She died in Istanbul on 25 January 2019. She had had kidney disease and a mental disorder. She was on a ventilator for 10 days before she died. According to her sister, Rubina Yasmeen, her family had travelled to Istanbul, Turkey to be with her in her last days.

Filmography

Television series
 Dastak Na Do
 Zair, Zabar, Pesh (1974)
 Kiran Kahani 
 Zard Gulab
 Darwaza
 Gardish
 Karwan
 Dehleez (1981)
 Sarab
 Kaanch Ka Pul
 Ek Mohabat Sau Afsaney
 Apnay Log
 Neelay Hath (1989)
 Kala Diara
 Qila Kahani
 Bazgasht
 Kache Pakke Rang
 Hairat Kadah
 Pakki Haveli
 Sood-o-Zea
 Adhay Chehray

Telefilm
 Aakhri Geet
 Aik Aur Aurat

Film
 Umang (1975)
 Palki (1975)
 Insan Aur Farishta (1976)
 Goonj Uthi Shehnai (1976)
 Rastay Ka Pathar (1976)
 Tipu Sultan (1977)
 Khuda Aur Mohabbat (1978)
 Dushman Ki Talash (1978)
 Zamir (1980)
 Samjhota (1980)
 Aazmaish (1980)
 Dil Ek Khilona (1981)
 Kiran Aur Kali (1981)
 Bara Aadmi (1981)
 Kainat (1983)
 Aaj Ka Insan (1984)
 Da Dushman Talash (1987)

Tribute and honours
In 2019 on February 3 Pakistan National Council of the Arts paid tributes to her and described her a dignified, refined and polished artist. In 2021 on August 16 the Government of Pakistan named a street and intersection after her in Lahore.

Awards and recognition

References

External links
 

1951 births
20th-century Pakistani actresses
Actresses in Urdu cinema
21st-century Pakistani actresses
Pakistani film actresses
2019 deaths
Pakistani television actresses
People from Karachi
Punjabi people
Lux Style Award winners
Nigar Award winners
PTV Award winners
Pakistani female models
Recipients of the Pride of Performance
Deaths from kidney failure
Hum Award winners
Government College University, Lahore alumni